The International Ski Federation (FIS) Alpine Ski World Cup was the premier circuit for alpine skiing competition. The inaugural season launched in January 1967, and the  season marks the 53rd consecutive year for the FIS World Cup.

This season began in October 2018 in Sölden, Austria, and concluded in mid-March 2019 at the finals in Soldeu, Andorra. The biennial World Championships interrupted the tour in early February in Åre, Sweden. During the season, the most successful female skier of all time, four-time overall World Cup champion Lindsey Vonn of the United States, retired after the World Championships, at which she won a bronze medal in downhill.  Also, two-time overall champion Aksel Lund Svindal of Norway retired at the same meet, at which he won a silver medal in downhill.

Marcel Hirscher of Austria won his eighth straight men's overall championship, an all-time record, and moved in third place in overall wins (68) behind only Ingemar Stenmark (86) and Vonn (82).  Mikaela Shiffrin of the United States won her third straight women's overall championship and moved into 5th place on the overall win list (60).  After the season, Hirscher also retired.

Men

Calendar

Rankings

Overall

Downhill

Super G

Giant Slalom/Parallel Giant Slalom

Slalom/Parallel Slalom

Combined

Women
Prior to the start of the season, 4-time overall World Cup champion (and 20-time crystal globe winner) Lindsey Vonn of the United States announced her retirement effective as of the end of the season. Due to lingering injuries, she moved her retirement date up to the World Championships in February.

In December, Mikaela Shiffrin became the eighth athlete (four men, four women) to win at least 50 World Cup races across all disciplines, as well as the youngest (at age 23) to do so. Shiffrin ended the season with 17 race victories (3 Super Gs, 4 giant slaloms, 8 slaloms, and 2 parallel slaloms/city events), breaking Vreni Schneider's 30-year-old record of 14 wins in a (much shorter) season, which was set in the 1988-89 season. Shiffrin also won four crystal globes for the season, tying the women's record held by Vonn and Tina Maze.

On 6 March 2019, former slalom season champion (and Olympic gold medalist) Frida Hansdotter announced her retirement from alpine skiing following the 2018–2019 season.

Calendar

Rankings

Overall

Downhill

Super G

Giant Slalom

Slalom/Parallel Slalom

Combined

Alpine team event

Calendar

* reserve skiers

Nations Cup

Overall

Men

Ladies

Prize money

Top-5 men

Top-5 ladies

Footnotes

References 

 
FIS Alpine Ski World Cup
World Cup
World Cup